Luca Forte (born 28 July 1994) is an Italian footballer. He plays for Serie D club Correggese.

Club career
He made his professional debut in the Serie B for Varese on 13 May 2013 in a game against Crotone.

References

External links
 
 

1994 births
Footballers from Trieste
Living people
Italian footballers
Italy youth international footballers
Association football forwards
S.S.D. Varese Calcio players
Delfino Pescara 1936 players
F.C. Pro Vercelli 1892 players
S.S. Teramo Calcio players
A.C. Monza players
A.C. Carpi players
A.C.N. Siena 1904 players
S.S.D. Correggese Calcio 1948 players
Serie B players
Serie C players
Serie D players